The Treize Tournoi was a short-lived Anglo-French rugby league competition held at the end of the season in 1998. Known as the EMAP Treize Tournoi for sponsorship reasons, the tournament was organised by the First and Second Division Association, and was contested by the winners and runners-up of the First Division, the winners of the Second Division, and three teams from the French Championship.

Teams
 Wakefield Trinity
 Featherstone Rovers
 Lancashire Lynx
 St-Estève
 Limoux
 Villeneuve

Results

Week 1

Week 2

Week 3

Week 4

Final

References

External links
 ladepeche.fr

1998 in English rugby league
1998 in French rugby league